13 Washington Square is a 1928 American silent romantic comedy drama film directed by Melville W. Brown, written by Harry O. Hoyt and Walter Anthony, and starring Jean Hersholt, Alice Joyce, and George J. Lewis. It is based on a 1914 play of the same name by Leroy Scott. The film was released on April 8, 1928 by Universal Pictures.

Cast
Jean Hersholt as 'Diacono' Pyecroft
Alice Joyce as Mrs. De Peyster
George J. Lewis as Jack De Peyster
ZaSu Pitts as Mathilde
Helen Foster as Mary Morgan
Helen Jerome Eddy as Olivetta
Julia Swayne Gordon as Mrs. Allistair
Jack McDonald as Mayfair
Jerry Gamble as Sparks

Preservation
A copy of 13 Washington Square is housed at UCLA Film and Television Archive and the Library of Congress.

References

External links

1928 films
1920s English-language films
1920s romantic comedy-drama films
American romantic comedy-drama films
Universal Pictures films
American black-and-white films
American silent feature films
Films directed by Melville W. Brown
1928 comedy films
1928 drama films
American films based on plays
1920s American films
Silent romantic comedy-drama films
Silent American comedy-drama films